Macroglossus (nectar bat) is a genus of megabats (family Pteropodidae) found in Indonesia and Southeast Asia. It has two species:

Long-tongued nectar bat, Macroglossus minimus
Long-tongued fruit bat, Macroglossus sobrinus

References

 
Bat genera
Taxa named by Frédéric Cuvier